Grevillea bipinnatifida, commonly known as fuchsia grevillea, is a species of flowering plant in the family Proteaceae and is endemic to the south-west of Western Australia. It is a spreading shrub, usually with bipinnatifid leaves and loose clusters of dull pink to crimson flowers.

Description

Taxonomy
Grevillea bipinnatifida was first formally described in 1830 by Robert Brown in Supplementum primum prodromi florae Novae Hollandiae from specimens collected by Charles Fraser near the Swan River in 1827. The specific epithet (bipinnatifida) means "bipinnatifid", referring to the leaves that are pinnatifid, the parts themselves pinnatifid.

In 2004, Raymond Cranfield described two subspecies in the journal Nuytsia, and the names are accepted by the Australian Plant Census:

Distribution and habitat
Fuchsia grevillea grows in heath, open forest and woodland between Mogumber and Collie, mainly on the Darling Range in the Avon Wheatbelt, Jarrah Forest and Swan Coastal Plain biogeographic regions of south-western Western Australia. Subspecies pagna is only known from near Waroona where it grows in shrubland.

Cultivars
Hybrid cultivars have been produced which have Grevillea bipinnatifida as a parent species. These include hybrids with Grevillea banksii such as:
G.'Coconut Ice'
G. 'Claire Dee' 
G. 'Peaches and Cream'
 G. 'Robyn Gordon'
 G. 'Superb'

Other hybrids include:
 G. 'Molly' (a cross with G. aurea) 
 G. 'Sunrise' (a cross with G. 'Clearview Robin')

References

bipinnatifida
Eudicots of Western Australia
Proteales of Australia
Garden plants of Australia